The Cambridge Quintet is a book written by John L. Casti and published by Helix Books/Addison Wesley in 1998.

Synopsis 

The book describes a fictitious dinner party hosted by C. P. Snow at a Cambridge University college in 1949. During the dinner party Snow and his guests discuss the limits of machines trying to simulate human thinking. Snow's guests are Ludwig Wittgenstein, Erwin Schrödinger, J. B. S. Haldane and Alan Turing.

References

External links 
 Book Review by J. Lambek, McGill University

1998 American novels
Novels about cryptography
Novels about computing
American philosophical novels
Fiction set in 1949
Novels set in University of Cambridge
Novels set in one day
Novels set in the 1940s